"Flip, Flop and Fly" is a song recorded by Big Joe Turner in 1955. Called a "prototypical rocker", it was recorded by several early 
rock and roll performers. In 1973, a version by the Downchild Blues Band reached the record singles chart in Canada.

Original song
"Flip, Flop and Fly" has an arrangement similar to Big Joe Turner's 1954 number 1 R&B chart hit "Shake, Rattle and Roll". Music critic Cub Koda suggests that "leftover verses [from the 'Shake, Rattle and Roll' recording session] were then recycled into Turner's follow-up hit, 'Flip, Flop and Fly.  Both are up-tempo twelve-bar blues with a strong backbeat.  "Flip, Flop and Fly" reached number 2 on Billboard magazine's R&B chart in 1955, less than one year after "Shake, Rattle and Roll".

Accompanying Turner on vocals are the song's writer Jesse Stone on piano, Al Sears on tenor sax, Connie Kay on drums, and unidentified trumpet, alto sax, baritone sax, guitar, and bass players.  Turner subsequently recorded several live versions of the song.

Other charting versions
In 1973, a rendition by the Canadian Downchild Blues Band reached number 35 on the RPM 100 singles chart. It was their only hit and is included on their second album Straight Up (1974).

References

1955 singles
Big Joe Turner songs
Atlantic Records singles
Blues songs
Songs written by Jesse Stone
The Blues Brothers songs